Juan Sebastián Peñaloza Ragga (born 3 May 2000) is a Colombian footballer who plays as a forward for Deportivo Pereira, on loan from Spanish club SD Huesca.

Club career
Born in Quibdó, Peñaloza was a CD Estudiantil de Medellín youth graduate, and moved to Spain on 19 September 2018, after signing a five-year contract with SD Huesca; he was initially assigned to the farm team AD Almudévar in Tercera División. The following 31 January, he moved on loan to Segunda División B side CD Teruel until June.

Peñaloza played for SD Ejea in the third division during the 2019–20 season, as the club became Huesca's new farm team. On 2 October 2020, he was loaned to fellow third tier side Racing de Ferrol.

On 9 August 2021, Peñaloza returned to his home country after agreeing to a one-year loan deal with Águilas Doradas Rionegro. He made his professional debut the following day, coming on as a half-time substitute for Juan Camilo Salazar and scoring the match's winner in a 1–0 home success over Patriotas Boyacá.

References

External links

2000 births
Living people
People from Quibdó
Colombian footballers
Association football forwards
Segunda División B players
Tercera División players
AD Almudévar players
CD Teruel footballers
SD Ejea players
SD Huesca footballers
Racing de Ferrol footballers
Categoría Primera A players
Águilas Doradas Rionegro players
Deportivo Pereira footballers
Colombian expatriate footballers
Colombian expatriate sportspeople in Spain
Expatriate footballers in Spain
Sportspeople from Chocó Department